Verbmobil was a long-term interdisciplinary Language Technology (esp. Machine Translation) research project with the aim of developing a system that could recognize, translate and produce natural utterances and thus "translate spontaneous speech robustly and bidirectionally for German/English and German/Japanese". 

Verbmobil research was carried out between 1993 and 2000 and received a total of 116 million German marks (roughly 60 million euros) in funding from Germany's Federal Ministry of Research and Technology, the Bundesministerium für Forschung und Technologie; industry partners (such as DaimlerChrysler, Siemens and Philips) contributed an additional 52 million DM (26 million euros).

In the Verbmobil II project, the University of Tübingen created semi-automatically annotated treebanks for German, Japanese and English spontaneous speech.
TüBa-D/S contains approximately 38,000 sentences or 360,000 words. 
TüBa-E/S  contains approximately  30,000 sentences or 310,000 words. 
TüBa-J/S contains approximately  18,000 sentences or 160,000 words.

Notes

External links
 DFKI Verbmobil Overview German Artificial Intelligence Research Institute - Verbmobil overview (in English)
 DFKI Verbmobil Portal German Artificial Intelligence Research Institute -   Verbmobil portal page (in German)

Computational linguistics
Machine translation